Lynette Grant Sadleir (born 1 August 1963) is a New Zealand paediatric neurologist and epileptologist, and a former synchronised swimmer and coach.

Biography
Born on 1 August 1963 in Vancouver, British Columbia, Canada, Sadleir competed for New Zealand in synchronised swimming at the 1984 Summer Olympics in Los Angeles. With her sister Katie Sadleir, she finished 12th in the women's duet. She also competed in the women's solo, finishing in 35th place.

After retiring from competition, Sadleir was the synchronised swimming coach for the New Zealand teams at three Commonwealth Games: in 1986, 1990 and 1994.

Sadleir is a paediatric neurologist and epileptologist, and was promoted to full professor in the Department of Paediatrics and Child Health at University of Otago, Wellington on 1 February 2019.

References

1963 births
Living people
Swimmers from Vancouver
Canadian synchronized swimmers
New Zealand synchronised swimmers
Canadian emigrants to New Zealand
New Zealand people of Scottish descent
Canadian people of Scottish descent
Canadian people of New Zealand descent
Synchronized swimmers at the 1984 Summer Olympics
Olympic synchronised swimmers of New Zealand
Canadian epileptologists
New Zealand women academics
New Zealand women scientists
Academic staff of the University of Otago
Synchronized swimming coaches
New Zealand swimming coaches